Sanaa is a genus of bush-crickets found in India, Indo-China and Malesia. It belongs to the tribe Cymatomerini within the subfamily Pseudophyllinae.  It may be confused with the genus Parasanaa, which has a similar distribution in Asia.

Species
The Orthoptera Species File and Catalogue of Life list:
Sanaa imperialis (White, 1846)
Sanaa intermedia Beier, 1944
Sanaa regalis (Brunner von Wattenwyl, 1895)

Nota bene: A binomial authority in parentheses indicates that the species was originally described in a genus other than Sanaa.

References

External links
 

 
Pseudophyllinae
Tettigoniidae genera
Invertebrates of Southeast Asia
Orthoptera of Asia